A pastry brush, also known as a basting brush, is a cooking utensil used to spread butter, oil or glaze on food. Traditional pastry brushes are made with natural bristles or a plastic or nylon fiber similar to a paint brush, while modern kitchen brushes may have silicone bristles. In baking breads and pastries, a pastry brush is used to spread a glaze or egg wash on the crust or surface of the food.
In roasting meats, a pastry brush may be used to sop up juices or drippings from under pan and spread them on the surface of the meat to crisp the skin.

See also

 Basting (cooking)
 Pastry chef
 Kitchen gadget

References

Kitchenware